Maly Samovets is a rural locality (a settlement) and the administrative center of Malosamovetskoye Rural Settlement, Verkhnekhavsky District, Voronezh Oblast, Russia. The population was 79 as of 2010. There are 7 streets.

Geography 
Maly Samovets is located 34 km northeast of Verkhnyaya Khava (the district's administrative centre) by road. Verkhnyaya Plavitsa is the nearest rural locality.

References 

Rural localities in Verkhnekhavsky District